"You Ain't Seen Nothin' Yet" is a song performed by Lisa Marie Presley, written by Presley, James Bryan McCollum and Sacha Skarbek. It is from her Storm & Grace album, and was released as a single on April 10, 2012. The song was described by the Presley Foundation's own website as having an "ominous, swampy vibe."

The single failed to chart, but the "smoky, spooky" single was well received by Entertainment Weekly. Presley made a guest appearance on American Idol on May 17, 2012, performing the song.

References

2012 songs
Lisa Marie Presley songs
Songs written by Sacha Skarbek
Song recordings produced by T Bone Burnett
2012 singles
Universal Republic Records singles
Songs written by James Bryan McCollum